The 1953 Hong Kong Urban Council election was held on 20 May 1953 for the four elected seats of the Urban Council of Hong Kong.

The elected seats extended from two seats to four seats in this election, which increased the total numbers of member from 13 to 15. For the first time the polling station was set in the Kowloon peninsula, at the Kowloon-Canton Railway Station in Tsim Sha Tsui, besides the one in Hong Kong Island. Despite that, only 2,536 of 10,798 eligible voters, about 20 percent of the electorate, cast ballots, less than last year.

All candidates from the Reform Club, including Brook Bernacchi and Woo Pak-chuen were elected, while incumbent William Louey lost the re-election.

Results

Citations

References
 Pepper, Suzanne (2008). Keeping Democracy at Bay:Hong Kong and the Challenge of Chinese Political Reform. Rowman & Littlefield.
 Lau, Y.W. (2002). A history of the municipal councils of Hong Kong : 1883-1999 : from the Sanitary Board to the Urban Council and the Regional Council. Leisure and Cultural Service Dept.

1953 elections in Asia
1953 in Hong Kong
Urban
May 1953 events in Asia
1953 elections in the British Empire